Kunle Odunlami (born 5 March 1990) is a Nigerian professional footballer, who plays as a defender for Gokulam Kerala FC.

International career
In January 2014, coach Stephen Keshi, invited him to be included in the Nigeria national football team for the 2014 African Nations Championship team,  where he started every match and made the tournament's Best XI as the team placed third.

References

Living people
2014 African Nations Championship players
2014 FIFA World Cup players
Nigerian footballers
1990 births
Yoruba sportspeople
Nigeria international footballers
Liga I players
FC Botoșani players
Nigerian expatriate footballers
Expatriate footballers in Romania
Nigerian expatriate sportspeople in Romania
Association football defenders
Nigeria A' international footballers
Sunshine Stars F.C. players
First Bank F.C. players
Nigerian expatriate sportspeople in India
Gokulam Kerala FC players
Expatriate footballers in India